Alejandro de la Sota Martínez (October 20, 1913 - 14 February 1996) was a Spanish architect. He was born in Pontevedra in Galicia. He graduated from the Technical University of Madrid in 1941 and, from 1956 to 1972 he was a professor there.

After graduation, de la Sota continued to live in Madrid, although he maintained links with his native Galicia.  He was a promoter of the industrialisation of construction in the 1960s. His Maravillas School gymnasium of 1961 was the first steel-framed building in Madrid. Dora's buildings combine geometric rigor with constructive sincerity and a structural boldness of form that still surprises today.

De la Sota received the National Prize of Architecture and the Gold Medal of the Council of Architects.

Works
 Cruz Gallástegui Building, Galicia Biological Mission (1949) (Pontevedra)
 Gobierno Civil (Tarragona) (1956-1963)
 Talleres Aeronáuticos TABSA (Madrid) (1957-1958)
  (Madrid) (1961)
 Block of houses (Salamanca) (1963)
 César Carlos Residential College (Madrid) (1967)
 Children's Summer Residence (Miraflores de la Sierra) (1957-1959)
 CLESA dairy processing plant (Madrid) (1963)
 Houses in calle del Prior (Salamanca) (1962-1963)
 CENIM Industrial Building (Madrid) (1965-1967)
 Pontevedra Municipal Sports Hall (1966)
 Caja de Ahorros Provincial Residential School (Ourense) (1966-1967)
 Classrooms and Seminaries of the University (Sevilla) (1972)
 Computer center of the Post Office (Madrid) (1973-1976)
 Banco Pastor (Pontevedra) (1974)
 Post Office and Telecommunications Building (León) (1980-1983)
 Caja Postal de Ahorros Building (Madrid) (1986-1989)
 University Library (Santiago de Compostela) (1990)
 Court buildings (Zaragoza) (1991-1993)
 Redesign and Restoration of Cabildo Insular Building (Las Palmas) (1994)

Gallery

1913 births
1996 deaths
People from Pontevedra
Polytechnic University of Madrid alumni
20th-century Spanish architects
Architects from Galicia (Spain)